Naveen-ul-Haq Murid (born 23 September 1999) is an Afghan cricketer. He made his international debut for the Afghanistan cricket team in September 2016.

Domestic and T20 franchise career
Naveen made his first-class debut for Kabul Region in the 2018 Ahmad Shah Abdali 4-day Tournament on 7 March 2018.

In September 2018, Naveen was named in Nangarhar's squad in the first edition of the Afghanistan Premier League tournament. In November 2019, he was selected to play for the Sylhet Thunder in the 2019–20 Bangladesh Premier League. In July 2020, he was named in the Guyana Amazon Warriors squad for the 2020 Caribbean Premier League. In October 2020, he was drafted by the Kandy Tuskers for the inaugural edition of the Lanka Premier League.

In February 2021, Naveen was signed by the Leicestershire Foxes ahead of the 2021 T20 Blast tournament in England. In October 2021, he was resigned by Leicestershire for the 2022 summer in England. In June 2022, in the T20 Blast match against the Worcestershire Rapids, he took his first five-wicket haul in Twenty20 cricket, with 5/11 from his four overs. The following month, he was signed by the Colombo Stars for the third edition of the Lanka Premier League.

International career
Naveen made his One Day International (ODI) debut for Afghanistan against Bangladesh on 25 September 2016. Prior to his ODI debut, he was part of Afghanistan's squad for the 2016 Under-19 Cricket World Cup. In December 2016, he was the captain for Afghanistan in the 2016 Under-19 Asia Cup.

Naveen made his Twenty20 (T20) debut for Afghanistan against Namibia on 19 January 2017 in the 2017 Desert T20 Challenge.

In December 2017, Naveen was named as the captain of Afghanistan's squad for the 2018 Under-19 Cricket World Cup.

In August 2019, Naveen was named in Afghanistan's Twenty20 International (T20I) squad for the 2019–20 Bangladesh Tri-Nation Series. He made his T20I debut for Afghanistan, against Bangladesh, on 21 September 2019. In September 2021, he was named in Afghanistan's squad for the 2021 ICC Men's T20 World Cup.

References

External links
 

1999 births
Living people
Afghan cricketers
Afghanistan One Day International cricketers
Afghanistan Twenty20 International cricketers
Kabul Eagles cricketers
Cricketers from Kabul
Nangarhar Leopards cricketers
Kandy Falcons cricketers
Colombo Stars cricketers
Leicestershire cricketers